Roy Folkman (born 5 August 1975) is an Israeli politician. He served as a member of the Knesset for Kulanu between 2015 and 2019.

Biography
During his IDF national service Folkman served as a combat medic. After leaving the army, he was involved in the Society for the Protection of Nature in Israel, and studied for a BA in economics, Islam and Middle Eastern studies at the Hebrew University of Jerusalem, where he was leader of the student union. He later gained a master's degree in public policy, studying at the Kennedy School of Government at Harvard University.

Between 2008 and 2012 he worked as an advisor to the Mayor of Jerusalem Nir Barkat. In the 2013 he was placed sixth on Barkat's list for the City Council elections, but failed to win a seat.

Prior to the 2015 elections he joined the new Kulanu party, and was placed ninth on its list. He was elected to the Knesset as the party won ten seats. He was fourth on the Kulanu list for the April 2019 elections, and was re-elected as the party won four seats. However, when Kulanu merged into Likud prior to the September 2019 elections, Folkman did not join Likud, and subsequently lost his seat.

Folkman lives in the moshav of Nes Harim, and is married with two children.

References

External links

Living people
1975 births
People from Tel Aviv
Israeli Jews
Hebrew University of Jerusalem alumni
Harvard Kennedy School alumni
Kulanu politicians
Members of the 20th Knesset (2015–2019)
Members of the 21st Knesset (2019)
Israeli people of Hungarian-Jewish descent